The ESP Lakland brand produces bass guitars made by American bass guitar maker Lakland for the Japanese guitar company ESP. These basses are made solely for the Japanese market.

Products in the brand include:
ESP Lakland 4 Series Basses
Lakland 4-94 Deluxe
Lakland 4-94 Standard
Lakland 4-94 Classic
ESP Lakland 55 Series Basses
Lakland 55-94 Deluxe
Lakland 55-94 Standard
Lakland 55-94 Classic
ESP Lakland Signature Series Basses
Lakland Joe Osborn
Lakland Bob Glaub
ESP Lakland Shoreline Series Basses
Lakland SL4-94 Deluxe
Lakland SL4-94 Standard
Lakland SL4-94 Classic
Lakland SL55-94 Deluxe
Lakland SL55-94 Classic
Lakland SL Joe Osborn
Lakland SL Darryl Jones
Lakland SL Bob Glaub

See also
ESP Guitars

Lakland